Fosse Copse is a woodland in Devon, England, near the village of Loddiswell. It is owned and managed by the Woodland Trust. There is no public access.

References

Forests and woodlands of Devon